Jake Bargas (born November 28, 1996) is an American football fullback who is a free agent. After playing college football for the North Carolina Tar Heels, he signed with the Minnesota Vikings as an undrafted free agent in 2020.

Professional career

Minnesota Vikings
Bargas signed with the Minnesota Vikings as an undrafted free agent following the 2020 NFL Draft on April 27, 2020. He was waived during final roster cuts on September 5, 2020, and signed to the team's practice squad the next day. He was elevated to the active roster on December 24 for the team's week 16 game against the New Orleans Saints, and reverted to the practice squad after the game. He signed a reserve/future contract with the Vikings after the season on January 4, 2021.

On August 31, 2021, Bargas was waived by the Vikings and re-signed to the practice squad the next day.

On May 2, 2022, Bargas re-signed with the Vikings. He was released on August 16, 2022

Chicago Bears
On August 21, 2022, Bargas signed with the Chicago Bears. He was waived on August 23.

Miami Dolphins
On November 8, 2022, Bargas was signed to the Miami Dolphins practice squad.

References

External links
Minnesota Vikings bio
North Carolina Tar Heels football bio

1996 births
Living people
Sportspeople from Boca Raton, Florida
Players of American football from Florida
American football tight ends
American football fullbacks
North Carolina Tar Heels football players
Minnesota Vikings players
Chicago Bears players
Miami Dolphins players